Winchelsea is a town in Victoria, Australia. The town is located in the Surf Coast Shire local government area, the suburb or locality of Winchelsea is predominantly within Surf Coast Shire with a small section within the Colac Otway Shire. Winchelsea is located on the Barwon River 115 km south-west of Melbourne and close to Geelong (37 km north-east).

History 

The first Europeans to reside in the area were squatters (Lomas's) who established grazing runs there c. 1837. Thomas Austin migrated from Tasmania and occupied the present day site of Winchelsea in 1837. The area was then called Austin's Ford.

The town developed around the Barwon Inn, established in 1842 by Prosper Nicholas Trebeck and Charles Beal . The Post Office opened as Barwon on 1 July 1848 and was renamed Winchelsea in 1854.
The town was the administrative centre of the Shire of Winchelsea, which was proclaimed in 1864, and which continued until 9 March 1994 when it was amalgamated with the Shire of Barrabool to become the Surf Coast Shire.

The railway through the town was opened in 1876, as part of the line to the south west of the state. The local railway station is served by V/Line passenger services on the Warrnambool line.

Winchelsea Magistrates' Court closed on 1 October 1984.

Places of interest

 Barwon Hotel (1842) with a collection of historical artefacts.
 Old Shire Hall
Barwon River Bridge - Opened by Prince Alfred, Duke of Edinburgh, on 3 December 1867
Barwon Park Mansion - Built 1871 
The Globe Theatre

Heritage listed sites

Winchelsea contains a number of heritage listed sites, including:

 105 Inverleigh-Winchelsea Road, Barwon Park
 Princes Highway, Barwon River Bridge
 70 Hopkins Street, Eastern Reserve Memorial Grandstand and Gates
 17-19 Willis Street, Globe Theatre
 765 Ingleby Road, Ingleby Homestead

Sport
The town has an Australian Rules football team competing in the Geelong & District Football League.

The Winchelsea Golf Club is located between Lorne Road and Lauders Lane. The course is popular with locals and tourists alike.

The Winchelsea Cricket Club, formed in 1858 is one of the oldest sporting clubs in Victoria and currently compete in the Bellarine Peninsula Cricket Association

Notable people
 Elizabeth Phillips Harding  (1821 – 1910) a pioneer settler at Winchelsea who was a philanthropist noted for her endowment towards setting up The Austin Hospital in Melbourne in 1882
 Thomas Austin (1815-1871) husband of Elizabeth Phillips Harding, he introduced rabbits into Australia.
 John Rout Hopkins 1828-1897 a pioneer settler at Winchelsea who served in local government and the Victorian government for many years 
 Marjorie Lawrence, soprano, noted as an interpreter of Richard Wagner's operas, born at Deans Marsh, south of Winchelsea in 1907
 Denis Napthine MP (1952- ) Premier of the State of Victoria
Darcy Parish (1997- ) AFL Footballer with the Essendon Bombers
Albert Jacka VC, MC & Bar (1893 – 1932) Captain 14th Battalion AIF. First Australian to be decorated with the VC during the First World War.

See also

 Winchelsea railway station, Victoria

References

External links
The Sydney Morning Herald; Winchelsea -- Things to see
Susie Zada -- Barwon Park

Towns in Victoria (Australia)
Surf Coast Shire